6296 Cleveland, provisional designation , is a Hungaria asteroid from the innermost regions of the asteroid belt, approximately  in diameter. It was discovered on 12 July 1988, by American astronomer Eleanor Helin at the Palomar Observatory in California. The presumed E-type asteroid has a long rotation period of 30.8 hours and possibly an elongated shape. It was named for the city of Cleveland in the U.S. state of Ohio.

Orbit and classification 

Cleveland is a Hungaria asteroid, a dynamical group that forms the innermost dense concentration of asteroids in the Solar System. However it is a background asteroid and does not belong to the Hungaria family. It orbits the Sun in the inner main-belt at a distance of 1.8–2.0 AU once every 2 years and 7 months (950 days; semi-major axis of 1.89 AU). Its orbit has an eccentricity of 0.06 and an inclination of 27° with respect to the ecliptic.

Physical characteristics 

Cleveland is an assumed E-type asteroid.

Rotation period 

In April 2011, a rotational lightcurve of Cleveland was obtained from photometric observations by American astronomer Brian Warner at his Palmer Divide Observatory in Colorado. Lightcurve analysis gave a rotation period of 30.84 hours with a brightness amplitude of 0.70 magnitude, indicative of a non-spherical shape. While not being a slow rotator, Cleveland period is significantly longer than for most other asteroids, which typically have periods between 2 and 20 hours. The result supersedes previous measurements that gave 15.38 and 15.65 hours, or half the period solution of the 2011 measurement.

Diameter and albedo 

According to the survey carried out by the NEOWISE mission of NASA's Wide-field Infrared Survey Explorer, Cleveland measures between 3.179 and 3.74 kilometers in diameter and its surface has an albedo between 0.28 and 0.481.

The Collaborative Asteroid Lightcurve Link adopts an albedo of 0.481 and a diameter of 3.18 kilometers based on an absolute magnitude of 13.9.

Naming 

This minor planet was named after the U.S. city of Cleveland as a tribute to its bicentennial celebration. The official naming citation was published by the Minor Planet Center on 9 September 1995.

Notes

References

External links 
 Asteroid Lightcurve Database (LCDB), query form (info )
 Dictionary of Minor Planet Names, Google books
 Discovery Circumstances: Numbered Minor Planets (5001)-(10000) – Minor Planet Center
 
 

006296
Discoveries by Eleanor F. Helin
Named minor planets
19880712